Mirko Đerić (Anglicized: Mirko Djeric; ; born 17 April 1995) is an Australian-Serbian professional basketball player for the Cairns Taipans of the National Basketball League (NBL).

Professional career 
Djeric started his career in 2012. He played for the Bankstown Bruins of the Waratah League, the NBL teams the Wollongong Hawks and the Townsville Crocodiles, and for the Townsville Heat of the Queensland Basketball League.

Prior to 2016–17 season, he signed for FMP of the Adriatic League. Later in 2016, he moved to Vršac of the Basketball League of Serbia. On 27 December 2017, he hit 9 three-pointers out of 11 attempts against Split.

On 30 May 2019, Djeric signed for the Cairns Taipans of the Australian NBL.

On 8 June 2021, Djeric joined the Cairns Marlins of the NBL1 North.

National team career 
Djeric was a member of the Australia national under-17 basketball team that won the silver medal at the 2012 FIBA Under-17 World Championship. Over eight tournament games, he averaged 9.8 points, 2.0 rebounds and 5.6 assists per game.

See also 
 List of foreign basketball players in Serbia

References

External links 

 Cairns Taipans player profile

1995 births
Living people
Australian expatriate basketball people in Serbia
Australian men's basketball players
Australian people of Serbian descent
Basketball League of Serbia players
Basketball players from Sydney
Cairns Taipans players
Illawarra Hawks players
KK Dynamic players
KK FMP players
KK Vršac players
People from Blacktown, New South Wales
Point guards
Shooting guards
Townsville Crocodiles players
Sportsmen from New South Wales